Joys of the Youth is a 1987 Soviet drama film.

Plot
In order to get a credit for physical education, which they skipped, the company of students of the technical school persuaded classmate (Zudina) to fall in love with the physical education teacher (Lyubshin) and persuade him.

The girl begins to hunt for an unapproachable bachelor teacher. Unexpectedly for all, he falls in love with a student. Moreover, the girl understands that she herself is not indifferent to the teacher. History, conceived as a rally, becomes a drama for its participants.

Cast
Stanislav Lyubshin as Anton Mikhailovich Gorshkov
Marina Zudina as Svetlana Bobylyova
 Aleksei Serebryakov as Pan
 Natalia Nazarova as Marya Gavrilovna
 Valentina Telichkina as Nina Vasilievna
 Viktor Pavlov as Svetlana's father
 Vyacheslav Nevinny as Mylnikov

Criticism 
Director Yevgeny Gerasimov is not suspected of blind love for the younger generation. In the very title of his picture there is an ironic warning to those who are delighted with the youth looseness of the late eighties, and their own concern about the spiritual lack of spirituality of the younger generation.

Lyubshin played a physical education teacher so that you can fall in love with him. A really good picture, a love story in which problems and realities are depicted, but not an end in itself. A good love story is always interesting.

References

External links

 35 лучших перестроечных фильмов
1987 drama films
1987 films
Films scored by Gennady Gladkov
Gorky Film Studio films
1980s teen drama films
Soviet teen drama films